Alfred Putnam (September 8, 1836 – October 12, 1904) was a ship builder and political figure in Nova Scotia, Canada. He represented Hants in the House of Commons of Canada from 1887 to 1896 as a Conservative member.

He was born in Noel, Hants County, Nova Scotia, of Scottish descent. He married Maggie Fleming in 1866. Putnam was president of the Hants County Marine Insurance Company. He ran unsuccessfully for reelection to the House of Commons in 1896 and 1900.

Electoral record

References 
 
The Canadian parliamentary companion, 1891, JA Gemmill

1836 births
1904 deaths
Progressive Conservative Association of Nova Scotia MLAs
Conservative Party of Canada (1867–1942) MPs
Members of the House of Commons of Canada from Nova Scotia